Robert F. Dill (1927-2004) (Robert Floyd Dill or Bob Dill) was a marine geologist. He is perhaps best known for his studies on stromatolites, the submarine canyons in California and his collaboration with Jacques Cousteau.

Selected publications
 Dill, R. F., Shinn, E. A., Jones, A. T., Kelly, K., & Steinen, R. P. (1986). Giant subtidal stromatolites forming in normal salinity waters, Nature 324,  November 55-58
 Dill, Robert F. (1964) "Sedimentation and erosion in Scripps submarine canyon head." Papers in Marine Geology23-41.

References

1927 births
2004 deaths
20th-century American geologists
Marine geologists